Unchahar Junction railway station (station code:- UCR) is the junction railway station located in Unchahar, Rae Bareli district, Uttar Pradesh state, India. It consists of three platforms. It falls under Northern Railway zone's Lucknow NR railway division.

Unchahar changed dramatically after the work done by former Member of Legislative Assembly, Late. Har Narayan Singh. Some of his work include the establishment of the well known Feroze Gandhi Thermal Power Station of the National Thermal Power Corporation, which now has an installed capacity of 1050 MW and the launching of the daily train Unchahar Express connecting Allahabad with Chandigarh.

References

Divisions of Indian Railways

Transport in Uttar Pradesh